Disney Networks Group Asia Pacific Limited, (formerly Satellite Television Asian Region Limited (from 2001 trading as Star TV, stylised as STAR TV, and then as Star until 2009), subsequently Fox International Channels Asia Pacific Limited and Fox Networks Group Asia Pacific Limited), is a Singapore and Taiwan-based commercial broadcasting company operating multiple specialty television channels. The company is formerly part of the Fox Networks Group, and is currently owned by The Walt Disney Company since March 2019.

Originally established by Hutchison Whampoa and later acquired by the original News Corporation, Star TV was once the prominent satellite television broadcaster in the entire Asia region. On 20 March 2019 following Disney's acquisition of 21st Century Fox's entertainment assets, FNG Asia and Star India became a part of Disney, and FNG Asia Pacific merged with Disney Branded Television unit.

DNG Asia Pacific's channels are available in Southeast Asia and it previously served East Asia, South Asia and the Middle East.

History

Launch
The company was originally registered to the Companies Registry of Hong Kong as Quford Limited on 31 August 1990. The company was renamed Hutchvision Channel Services Limited on 31 January 1991 before becoming Satellite Television Asian Region Limited on 4 July 1991. It was established by Hutchison Whampoa (which also owned the health and beauty retailer A.S. Watson Group at the time) and was headed by Richard Li (son of Li Ka-Shing, the founder of Cheung Kong which owns Hutchison Whampoa).

The company operated its television channels under a unified brand, Star TV. In its initial years, the channels were broadcast over AsiaSat 1 communication satellite operated by Asia Satellite Telecommunications which was a consortium of Hutchison Whampoa, China International Trust and Investment Corporation and Cable & Wireless Worldwide. As with the satellite's footprint, the channels reached from the Far East to the Middle East. The Star TV Network's initial line-up of advertisement-supported five free-to-air channels at its launch was digital electronic by Sony based in Tokyo were as follows:
 Prime Sports (officially launched on 26 August 1991): 24-hour multi-sport television channel broadcast in English and Chinese; joint venture with TCI in the United States which owned Prime Network.
 MTV (officially launched on 15 September 1991): 24-hour music channel broadcast in English, Hindi and Chinese, focused on pop music; joint venture with Viacom in the United States which owned the American TV channel of the same name.
 BBC WSTV (officially launched on 14 October 1991): 24-hour news, current affairs and information from the BBC this version of BBC World Service Television.
 Chinese Channel (officially launched on 21 October 1991): 24-hour all full Mandarin Chinese and Cantonese variety entertainment channel that showcased full Cantonese and Chinese language content provided by CTV in Taiwan and ATV in Hong Kong broadcasts from Mainland China; also showed television series from other Greater China countries including China, Hong Kong, Macau and Taiwan.
 Entertainment (officially launched on 15 December 1991): 24-hour English language variety entertainment channel which showed dramas and variety shows from English-speaking countries including United States, United Kingdom, Australia and New Zealand.

STAR TV was officially opening ceremony with very first opening programme such as:
 Prime Sports: New York City US Open Tennis (officially launched on 26 August 1991 at 17:00 Hong Kong Time)
 MTV: 1991 MTV Video Music Awards (officially launched on 15 September 1991 at 06:00 Hong Kong Time)
 BBC WSTV: BBC News (officially launched on 14 October 1991 at 12:00 Hong Kong Time)
 Chinese Channel: Doraemon (officially launched on 21 October 1991 at 16:30 Hong Kong Time)
 Entertainment: The Bold and the Beautiful (officially launched on 15 December 1991 at 18:00 Hong Kong Time)

On 1 October 1992, Star TV added Zee TV (which targeted Hindi-speaking audiences) from Zee Telefilms in India to its line-up.

In February 1993, Julian Mounter, former director-general of Television New Zealand, was appointed as president and Chief Executive of the company.

In March 1993, Star TV was offered to join ranks made by the Asia Business News.

In June 1993, Star TV and Wharf Cable signed a deal in which Hong Kong's new cable television provider would carry Star TV's channels. However, the deal was terminated in February 1994 in the carriage dispute between the two parties.

Sale to News Corporation
Star TV's viewership across Asia have increased over the years, and it attracted advertisers. But the business was making loss. The company has been looking for an Anglophone partner for financial investments, additional English language programming and technical assistance, especially to launch a pay-television system that would carry encrypted channels.

By late April 1993, Pearson approached Star TV's owners, and was expected to pay up to GBP 100 million. Pearson (which owned minor stake in British broadcasters BSkyB and Yorkshire-Tyne Tees Television at the time, and have just acquired Thames Television) has been looking to expand its media business outside the UK, especially because the British laws at that time did not allow Pearson to expand more on UK television business. Pearson was looking for the 66% of the company, but the deal was reported to have required the Hong Kong side to remain active shareholders, making the deal to be turned down.

The initial negotiations with Rupert Murdoch were reported to have foundered after the Australian businessman demanded a controlling stake in the Hong Kong company. On 1 July 1993, Rupert Murdoch's News Corporation officially grand formal full purchasing 100% of Star TV for US$525 million, half in cash, half in News Corporation's ordinary shares, blocking offers from Pearson. The deal came after News Corporation failed to acquire 22% of TVB because of regulatory issues. News Corporation acquired the remaining 36.4% for US$299 million in July 1995. Li family and Hutchison Whampoa would retain its shares in Hutchvision Hong Kong Limited, which uplinked Star TV's channels. With the amount of money made from the 1993 sale, Richard Li went on to establish his own venture, Pacific Century Group.

On 1 August 1993, following News Corporation's takeover, Julian Mounter resigned as Chief Executive of the company. Sam Chisholm, who was the head of BSkyB at the time, became acting Chief Executive before he was formally appointed.

With the controversial removal of BBC World Service Television from the company's satellite television offerings for Northeast Asia in 1994 (discussed below), Star TV replaced the BBC channel with two channels; English-language film channel Star Movies and Chinese-language film channel Star Chinese Movies.

Star TV and Viacom (MTV) ended partnership that supplied music television programming, so Star TV launched Channel V to replace the American brand. The Indian version was launched on 23 May 1994, it was followed by four additional versions: Channel V International, Channel V Thailand, Channel V Korea, Channel V Japan, and another three versions in Mandarin Chinese, Vietnamese and Cantonese.

On 30 March 1996 at 7 pm Hong Kong Time, Star TV split into Star Plus and Star Chinese Channel by certain areas:
 Star Plus would continue to serve viewers in South Asia and the Middle East, while East and Southeast Asian viewers would receive the newly relaunched Star World channel.
 Star Chinese Channel would still be available to the viewers in Taiwan, but the television watchers in Hong Kong and the Mainland China would get the new Phoenix Chinese Channel instead.

On 6 May 1996, Star TV launched Viva Cinema, the 24-hour Filipino film channel, in partnership with Viva Entertainment. STAR later exited from the partnership and did not renew their contract, and the channel was relaunched as Pinoy Box Office on 1 August 2003.

On 1 October 1996, Star Sports (since renamed from Prime Sports) and ESPN Asia have agreed to combine their loss making operations in Asia. The new joint venture, later named ESPN Star Sports, would be headquartered in Singapore (where ESPN's operations in Asia were based in).

In 1997, Star TV launched Star Select package of television channels targeting the Middle East via the Orbit (now OSN) service.

On 18 February 1998, Star TV launched Star News, a news channel targeting India, in partnership with NDTV. It switched partner to ABP Group in 2003, before Star India completely gave up and sold their share in 2012.

In May 1999, Star TV migrated its services from AsiaSat 1 and 2 to AsiaSat 3S.

On 15 January 2000, STAR TV added Disney Channel, as the company handling it's distribution and ad sales for the channel, it marks the second partnership with The Walt Disney Company, which also owned ESPN.

On 1 July 2000, Zee TV ended partnership with Star TV. The Hong Kong-based company converted Star Plus to a Hindi entertainment channel, and introduced Star World in the area as an English entertainment replacement.

On New Year's Day (1 January) 2001 at midnight stroke, the company was officially launched new name and logo from Star TV to becomes Star, reflecting the company's evolution from a television brand to a new multi-service, new multi-platform brand, new century and new millenium. In Chinese, the company referred itself as Xīngkōng Chuánméi instead of Wèixīng Diànshì from then on. It introduced a new set of logos. The logo scheme of the Star network (the name of the channel next to the Star logo icon, contained within a rectangle with two opposite corners rounded) that had been used throughout 2007.

2009 restructure, refocus on East and Southeast Asia
On 19 August 2009, News Corporation announced a restructure of Star. Star India and Star Greater China would be separated from Star's headquarters in Hong Kong, and the heads of the former two companies would report directly to James Murdoch, News Corporation's then-Chairman and Chief Executive for Europe and Asia.
 Star India took over all of Star's operations in India, as well as sales and distribution of Fox-branded channels in the region. It also took over Star's distribution offices in the Middle East, the United Kingdom and the United States.
 Star Greater China would oversee Star Chinese Channel, Star Chinese Movies, Star Chinese Movies 2, Xing Kong and Channel V Mainland China, as well as Fortune Star film library.
 The original Star TV company became Fox International Channels Asia Pacific, and would now focus on East and Southeast Asia. It also took over the representation of FIC channels from NGC Network Asia, LLC (the channels that were distributed by Star anyway). The company would continue to distribute its channels in the Middle East, and would take responsibility of the distribution of Star India and Star Greater China's channels in Asia outside their home markets.

Despite the 2009 reorganisations, the company change its legal name from Satellite Television Asian Region Limited. It only was officially launched new name and logo to becomes Fox International Channels Asia Pacific Limited on the same time.

In August 2010, it was announced that News Corporation would sell a controlling stake in its assets in mainland China to China Media Capital (CMC). Xing Kong (both domestic and international versions) and Channel V Mainland China, plus Fortune Star film library were in the sale, and a joint venture named Star China Media was created in the process. CMC acquired the remaining stake in Star China Media in January 2014.

In June 2012, it was announced that News Corporation would buy ESPN International's share in the joint venture ESPN Star Sports. The versions of ESPN broadcast in Hong Kong, Taiwan and Southeast Asia were rebranded as Fox Sports on 28 January 2013, and Star Sports became Fox Sports 2 on 15 August 2014. The Fox Sports rebrand did not affect India and East Asia: In India, Star India took over ESPN Star Sports' Indian subsidiary, and kept the ESPN name until 6 November 2013, when all of Star India's sports channels were relaunched under the Star Sports brand; a version of Star Sports broadcast to mainland China and South Korea kept the brand, and instead, the version of ESPN for mainland China was renamed Star Sports 2 on 1 January 2014.

In the wake of 2011 News Corporation scandals, the original News Corporation was split into 21st Century Fox and the new News Corp on 28 June 2013, with the television businesses (which FIC Asia was a part of) going to 21st Century Fox.

In October 2013, 12.15% of share in Phoenix Television held by 21st Century Fox (through Star) was sold to TPG Capital for HK$1.66 billion (about US$213.73 million). This and 2014 sale of Star China Media marked 21st Century Fox's exit from Mandarin entertainment television market in mainland China.

By 2014, Fox International Channels Middle East took over the distribution of Star World, Star Movies, National Geographic-branded channels, Fox-branded channels, Channel V International, Baby TV and Sky News in the Middle East and North Africa from Star Select. (Now renamed Fox Networks Group Middle East, the Middle East business is, together with FNG Asia Pacific, still a part of the wider FNG Asia operations.)

In January 2016, the company's parent unit, Fox International Channels, was announced to be split into three divisions, which would see the heads of newly renamed Fox Networks Group Europe, Fox Networks Group Latin America and Fox Networks Group Asia all reporting to CEO Peter Rice and COO Randy Freer at Fox Networks Group in the United States, thus abolishing Fox International Channels as a separate unit from 21st Century Fox's television business in the U.S. Accordingly, the company was officially launched new name and logo to becomes Fox Networks Group Asia Pacific Limited on 29 February 2016.

On 5 December 2017, Star India's Chairman and CEO Uday Shankar was appointed as 21st Century Fox's president for Asia, and the President of Fox Networks Group Asia would report directly to Shankar (instead of the equivalent at FNG U.S.).

Disney ownership and channel operations closure
With the acquisition of 21st Century Fox's entertainment assets by The Walt Disney Company, FNG Asia Pacific (including FNG Taiwan, and FNG's remaining businesses in mainland China), as well as Star India, became a part of Disney and FNG Asia were integrated into Walt Disney Direct-to-Consumer & International (now Disney International Operations) unit. Fox Networks Group Asia was split into three, as to plug into the Disney International structure with offices in Shanghai (Northern Asia), Mumbai (India) and Singapore (Southeast Asia). The reconfiguration and layoff began on 29 June 2020 with layoff focused on FNG Asia's Hung Hom, Kowloon headquarters, which dates back to the 1993 acquisition by a 21st Century Fox predecessor of PCCW.

The Walt Disney Company has announced to officially shutting down 18 of their pay TV channels on Friday, 1 October 2021 as Disney prioritized the rollout for Disney+ across Asian territories (or Disney+ Hotstar for Indonesia, Malaysia and Thailand). Mentioned pay TV channels include Fox Sports network, in which at the time, they broadcast Formula 1 and MotoGP along with all four major Grand Slams and most of UFC fights and Fox Movies network, which also include Fox Action Movies and Fox Family Movies, when Disney, Marvel Studios, and 20th Century films were absent following the acquisition.

National Geographic, National Geographic Wild, Star Chinese Channel and Star Chinese Movies will remain on-air as most of Fox Sports Asia programming heading elsewhere after the closure, such as SPOTV which replaced the main Fox Sports channel on launch while also aired the remainder of 2021 MotoGP World Championship, awhile latest Walt Disney, Marvel and 20th Century films were released through Disney+ (or Disney+ Hotstar). General entertainment contents which has been aired on Fox and Fox Life are either moved to Disney+ or, following the shutdown, through Fox's rival channels such as Lifetime (which Disney partly-owned the channel via A&E Networks), AXN, Rock Entertainment, TrueVisions (True Series), Now TV (Now Studio), among others.

This caused some of their employees, including Singapore-based marketing leads Daniel Tan and Shoba Martin to leave the company following the pay TV operation shutdown, awhile at the same time, this decision has been criticized due to poor Internet connectivity in some areas and also got no plans to rollout Disney+ for other smaller regions.

Meanwhile in Taiwan, Disney Channel has officially closed on New Year's Day 2022 as Disney contents relocated to Disney+ permanently. Meanwhile at the same time, both Fox Movies and Fox rebrand themselves as Star Movies Gold (which, unlike Star Movies HD, has different movie lineups and using branding from the first incarnation) and Star World respectively. This marked the only country with Disney channels operating under the Star brand alongside currently existed Star Chinese Movies and Star Chinese Channel.

List of channels provided

Current 
The Walt Disney Company (Taiwan) Ltd.
Star Chinese Channel Taiwan – a 24-hour Taiwanese Mandarin entertainment channel available only in Taiwan. It is one of the five original Star TV channels when it launched on 21 October 1991. It currently broadcasts on signals for Taiwan audiences.
Star Chinese Movies Taiwan – a 24-hour Taiwanese Mandarin movie channel available only in Taiwan. Was split off from Star Chinese Channel and launched on 1 May 1994 as "Star Mandarin Movies" and re-launched on 30 March 1996 as "Star Chinese Movies". It currently broadcasts on signals for Taiwan audiences.
Star Entertainment Channel Taiwan – a 24-hour Taiwanese Mandarin entertainment channel available on CHT MOD only in Taiwan and certain cable TV providers in Taiwan.
Star Movies Gold and Star Movies HD Taiwan – a 24-hour HD Taiwanese English movie channels available only in Taiwan. Star Movies Gold and Star Movies HD have its own programming and logo.
Star World Taiwan – a 24-hour Taiwanese English entertainment channel available only in Taiwan relaunched based in Taiwan on New Year's Day (1 January) 2022 at midnight stroke NST.
The Walt Disney Company (Southeast Asia) Pte. Ltd.
National Geographic Channel – a 24-hour channel available in HD and now officially shift its ownership to National Geographic Partners.
Nat Geo Wild – a 24-hour channel available in HD and now officially shift its ownership to National Geographic Partners.
BabyTV – the first 24-hour commercial-free channel for children under pre-schoolers. This channel is now available worldwide.

Former 
Fox – a 24-hour Southeast Asian entertainment channel.
FX – a 24-hour channel offering a broad mix programming targeted at male audiences including comedy, action sports, drama series, reality shows, cars and swimsuit model programs. It was available in Singapore, Hong Kong, Thailand, Vietnam, the Philippines, Japan, Taiwan, South Korea, India, Indonesia and Malaysia.
Fox Sports – a 24-hour sports channel.
Fox Life – a 24-hour channel offering broad programming of television series, sitcoms and movies programs. It was available in Singapore, Hong Kong, Thailand, Vietnam, the Philippines, Japan, Taiwan, South Korea, India, Indonesia, and Malaysia.
Fox Movies – a 24-hour English movie channel which was available in Macau, Hong Kong, Mongolia, Singapore, Philippines, Papua New Guinea, Palau, Taiwan, Thailand, Indonesia, Myanmar, Maldives, Cambodia, Brunei, Fiji, Guam, Laos, Vietnam, and Malaysia. The Taiwan feed of Fox Movies was rebranded to Star Movies Gold on January 1, 2022.
Fox Action Movies
Fox Family Movies – a 24-hour Southeast Asian movie channel.
Fox Crime – the first and only 24-hour factual and fictional entertainment television channel dedicated to crime, investigation and mystery. Available in Singapore, Hong Kong, Vietnam, the Philippines, Indonesia, Thailand, Japan, Taiwan, the Middle East and South Korea.
Nat Geo People – formerly known as A1 and Nat Geo Adventure.
Star Sports – a 24-hour sports channel available only in Mainland China.
Star Chinese Movies Legend – (formerly known as STAR Chinese Movies 2) a 24-hour Cantonese and Mandarin movie channel that shows popular Chinese box-office hits from the 1970 until 1993. It is currently available in Singapore, Hong Kong, Thailand, Macau, Indonesia, the Middle East and Malaysia.
Disney Channel – 24-hour pan-Asian pay TV channel which was available in the Philippines, Indonesia, Thailand and Vietnam.
Disney Junior – 24-hour southeast Asian pay TV channel which was available in the Philippines, Indonesia, Thailand and Vietnam.
Channel [V] – a 24-hour international music video channel. There were local versions of Channel [V] in Hong Kong, Macau, the People's Republic of China, Taiwan (the Republic of China), the Philippines, India, Thailand, and Australia.
Fox Filipino – a 24-hour Filipino language general entertainment channel broadcast in the Philippines.
tvN – a 24-hour Korean language entertainment channel managed by CJ E&M, available to audiences in Hong Kong, Macau, Taiwan, Sri Lanka and Southeast Asia.
Xing Kong – also known as Star Space, is a Mandarin general entertainment channel in People's Republic of China. It was available in China, Singapore, Malaysia, Philippines, Middle East, India, and Indonesia.
Phoenix Chinese Channel – a 24-hour Mandarin international news and entertainment channel it was launched on 30 March 1996. Available in the Asia Pacific and the Middle East.
Phoenix InfoNews Channel – a 24-hour Mandarin international news channel it was launched on 1 January 2001. Available on Worldwide
Phoenix Movies Channel – a 24-hour Mandarin movie channel in People's Republic of China it was launched on 28 August 1998. Available in China and the Middle East.
Phoenix Hong Kong Channel – a 24-hour Cantonese news and entertainment channel in Hong Kong it was launched on 28 March 2011. Available on Hong Kong, Asia Pacific (Except ASEAN), Middle East, Australia, and the USA.
antv – an Indonesian national private commercial free-to-air terrestrial television channel in Indonesia.
 Viva Cinema – a Filipino Movie Channel from Viva Films in the Philippines subsidiary of Viva Entertainment.
 BBC World Service Television (now BBC World News) – a 24-hour English news channel and one of the original Star TV channels when it launched on 14 October 1991. It was a joint venture between BBC World News and Star TV, a subsidiary of BBC International Television, a member of BBC Television, and owned by BBC. It ended its affiliation on 31 March 1996 to broadcast separate ways.
 Star News (now ABP News) – a 24-hour Hindi and English news channel in India was launched on 18 February 1998.
 MTV Asia – a 24-hour music video channel and one of the original Star TV channels when it launched on 15 September 1991 a joint venture between MTV Networks Asia Pacific owned by Viacom and Star TV; but it ended its affiliation on 2 May 1994 to broadcast separate ways and was replaced by Channel V.
 Prime Sports – a 24-hour English and Mandarin sports channel and one of the original Star TV channels when it launched on 21 August 1991 a joint venture between Prime Network and Star TV; but it ended its affiliation 30 March 1996 to broadcast separate ways and it was replaced by Star Sports.
 Film Indonesia – a 24-hour Indonesian movie channel.
 Star Channel – a 24-hour Japanese movie channel.
 Star Plus – a 24-hour Indian entertainment channel.
 Star Plus Japan – a 24-hour Japanese entertainment channel.
 TechTV – a 24-hour computer channel. It was formerly seen in the Middle East via Star Select.
 EL TV – a 24-hour Hindi entertainment channel. EL TV ended its relationship with Star TV in 1999.
 Zee TV – a 24-hour Hindi entertainment channel. Zee Network ended its relationship with Star TV in 1999.
 Zee Cinema – a 24-hour Hindi movie channel. Zee Network ended its relationship with Star TV in 1999.
 CNBC Asia – a 24-hour English business news channel launched on 20 June 1995, this channel terminated within 2006 replacing CNBC Europe. It was formerly available in the Middle East via Star Select.
 CNBC Europe – a 24-hour English business news channel, formerly available on Star Select in the Middle East. This channel was terminated on 31 March 2007.
 The History Channel – a 24-hour history and biography channel in India. This channel was relaunched as Fox History and Entertainment in November 2008.
 Jetix – a 24-hour kids channel, formerly available on Star Select in the Middle East. This channel was terminated on 30 November 2008.
Channel V Korea – a music channel, the South Korean affiliate of Channel V, launched on 16 June 2001. The channel was temporarily shut down on 31 December 2008.
Fox News Channel – a 24-hour American international news channel and it was launched on 7 October 1996.
Sky News – a British international news channel available on Europe and Asia Pacific.
ITV Granada – a 24-hour British entertainment from ITV plc now only available on Star Select in the Middle East, dropped from the line-up in the rest of Asia in 2002. It was formerly known as Granada UKTV and Granada TV.
ESPN Star Sports – a 24-hour sports channel with broadcast by ESPN Star Sports (ESS) a joint venture with ESPN International.
ESPNews Asia – a 24-hour sports news channel.
Asianet – a 24-hour Indian entertainment channel and was launched on 30 August 1993.
Asianet Plus – a 24-hour Indian movie channel. It was launched on 23 July 2005.
Asianet Movies – a 24-hour Indian movie channel. It was launched on 15 July 2012.
Star World Asia – a 24-hour English entertainment channel with to Southeast Asia and one of the five original Star TV channels when it launched on 15 December 1991 as "Star Plus" and re-launched on 31 March 1996 as "Star World".
Star Vijay – a 24-hour Indian entertainment channel. It was launched on 24 November 1994.
Star Gold – a 24-hour Indian movie channel. It was launched on 17 September 2000.
Star Maa – a 24-hour Indian entertainment channel. It was launched in 2002.
Star Utsav – a 24-hour Indian entertainment channel. It was launched on 7 June 2004.
Star Suvarna – a 24-hour Indian entertainment channel. It was launched on 17 June 2007.
Star Jalsha – a 24-hour Indian entertainment channel. It was launched on 8 September 2008.
Star Pravah – a 24-hour Indian entertainment channel. It was launched on 24 November 2008.
Movies OK – a 24-hour Indian movie channel. It was launched on 6 May 2012.
Star World Premiere – a 24-hour Indian entertainment channel that aired popular shows from the United States and was launched on 24 September 2013.
Star Suvarna Plus – a 24-hour Indian movie channel. It was launched on 14 August 2013.
Star Jalsha Movies – a 24-hour Indian entertainment channel and was launched on 24 September 2013.

Criticism and controversy

Removal of BBC WSTV from line-up
The BBC and Star TV originally signed a deal that the Hong Kong operator would carry the BBC channel for 10 years. But in March 1994, the BBC and Star TV reached a deal after an out of court settlement, that would gradually drop BBC World Service Television from the satellite broadcaster's offerings. BBC WSTV would be dropped from the channel line-up for the Northeast Asia by mid-April that year, but would be available in the rest of Asia until 31 March 1996. The deal came after such demands from the government of the People's Republic of China.

It is alleged that the PRC government was unhappy with BBC coverage of China, and Murdoch's September 1993 speech which declared "(telecommunications) have proved an unambiguous threat to totalitarian regimes everywhere ... satellite broadcasting makes it possible for information-hungry residents of many closed societies to bypass state-controlled television channels", so the Beijing government threatened to block Star TV in the huge mainland Chinese market if the BBC was not withdrawn. The former prime minister Li Peng requested and obtained the ban of satellite dishes throughout the country.

There were also reported concerns surrounding editorial control of BBC WSTV after News Corporation's acquisition of Star TV.

The subsequent removal of the BBC channel, and many ensuing declaration from Murdoch, led critics to believe the businessman was striving to appease the Chinese government in order to have the ban lifted. Fairness and Accuracy in Reporting (FAIR) gave Rupert Murdoch a mock award titled "P.U.-litzer Prize" for "Media Hypocrite of the Year" in 1994.

In 2001, the BBC and CITVC signed a deal which would make BBC World available to "upmarket hotels, as well as guest houses and foreign apartments" in mainland China.

See also
 Fox Networks Group
 Star China Media (No longer a part of Disney Networks Group Asia Pacific)
 Disney Star
 Star (Disney+)
 Star+
 Fox Networks Group Middle East
 PCCW – part of Richard Li's Pacific Century Group, it operates Now TV, Viu and HK Television Entertainment

Notes

References

External links
 Disney Networks Group in Taiwan
 : The startv.com domain is now owned by Star India.
 
 Star TV at the Museum of Broadcast Communications's Encyclopedia of Television

Defunct television channels
Television in Singapore
Television stations in Singapore
Broadcasting in Singapore
Mass media in Singapore
Mass media in Southeast Asia
Mass media in Taiwan
Television in Taiwan
Broadcasting in Taiwan
Television stations in Taiwan
Television channels and stations established in 1990
Television channels and stations disestablished in 2021
Defunct mass media in Hong Kong
Mass media companies established in 1990
Mass media companies disestablished in 2021